Tepidibacillus fermentans is a Gram-positive, moderately thermophilic, spore-forming and motile bacterium from the genus of Tepidibacillus which has been isolated from an underground gas storage in Severo-Stavropolskoye in Russia.

References

External links 
Type strain of Tepidibacillus fermentans at BacDive -  the Bacterial Diversity Metadatabase
 

Bacillaceae
Bacteria described in 2014